The Toonumbar National Park is a protected national park located in the Northern Rivers region of New South Wales, Australia.

The park is part of the Focal Peak Group World Heritage Site Gondwana Rainforests of Australia inscribed in 1986 and added to the Australian National Heritage List in 2007.

Description
The park features subtropical rainforests protecting threatened plants and animals, such as the sooty owl, red-legged pademelon and yellow-bellied glider. The rainforests on Dome Mountain and the Murray Scrub are part of the World Heritage listed Gondwana Rainforests of Australia. The rugged landscape of Mount Lindesay, Dome Mountain and Edinburgh Castle have provided the inspiration for many local Aboriginal legends.

The Murray Scrub and the Dome Mountain Forest contain significant areas of subtropical and temperate rainforest and are listed as part of the World Heritage Gondwana Rainforests of Australia. There are also drier and cooler places in the park and this has resulted in incredible diversity of flora, from eucalypt woodlands and tall gum forests, to forests of bangalow palms.

Animals in the park include marbled frogmouth, koala, Albert lyrebird and rainforest reptiles and frogs. The rainforest area is an important refuge for a number of fruit-eating pigeons and insectivorous bats. Pademelons also live there.

Focal Peak Volcano situated in Mt Barney National Park was active 23 million years ago and was responsible for the eroded volcanic remains of Mount Lindesay, Dome Mountain and Edinburgh Castle that dominate the landscape today. The high rainfall combined with fertile soil have created lush rainforests.

On average, the park receives  of rain each year.

Native title claim
Toonumbar National Park was part of the successful Githabul Nation native title claim. The Native title claimant Trevor Close an Aboriginal lawyer fought the NSW Government fifteen years probono to win the historic Native Title claim in memory of his grandfather Rory Close and his children Nea Close, Marnie Close Sera Close, Issiah Close and Tomika Close, Yartha Close and Kory Close. Trevor Close Githabul Tribal name is Mudargun which means lawman.

Inside Toonumbar National Park there are a number of jurabihls (increase sites) which were recorded with the assistance of the late Auntie Millie Boyd in 1974 by Howard Creamer. These types of sites (involving a complex set of religious and ritualistic beliefs) are of National significance due to their rarity in Australia and the rest of the world. Dome Mountain is the Githabul sacred site for the rain ceremony. Edinburgh Castle is the Goanna site and owned by the Clara Williams descendants who reside at the Aboriginal Reservation Muli Muli, which is 10 km (6 mi) west of the town of Woodenbong.

Gallery

See also

 Protected areas of New South Wales

References

External links
 

National parks of New South Wales
Protected areas established in 1995
Gondwana Rainforests of Australia
1995 establishments in Australia
Northern Rivers
Kyogle Council